Harrison Township is one of the twenty townships of Darke County, Ohio, United States. The 2010 census found 2,255 people in the township, 1,328 of whom lived in the unincorporated portions of the township.

Geography
Located in the southwestern corner of the county, it borders the following townships:
Liberty Township - north
Neave Township - northeast corner
Butler Township - east
Monroe Township, Preble County - southeast corner
Jefferson Township, Preble County - south
Franklin Township, Wayne County, Indiana - west

Two incorporated villages are located in Harrison Township: Hollansburg in the northwest, and part of New Madison in the east.

Name and history
It is one of nineteen Harrison Townships statewide.

The area within the modern borders of Harrison Township was first settled in 1810, but it was abandoned after Native American attacks; no settlers returned until after the end of the War of 1812.  American soldiers built two forts in 1813 for that war within the bounds of the present township: Fort Black, near Main Street in present-day New Madison, and Fort Nesbitt, in Section 32.  After the war's end, some settlers returned to the area, along with many former residents of Kentucky.  Growth in population enabled Harrison Township to be formed by splitting Twin Township in May 1818; its initial area was reduced by the formation of German Township in 1820.  The first school was established in the township in 1819, while the township's first church was a Church of Christ.

Government
The township is governed by a three-member board of trustees, who are elected in November of odd-numbered years to a four-year term beginning on the following January 1. Two are elected in the year after the presidential election and one is elected in the year before it. There is also an elected township fiscal officer, who serves a four-year term beginning on April 1 of the year after the election, which is held in November of the year before the presidential election. Vacancies in the fiscal officership or on the board of trustees are filled by the remaining trustees.  The current trustees are Steve Bohn, Donald Drew, and Rob Godown, and the clerk is Cathy Mikesell.

References

External links
County website

Townships in Darke County, Ohio
Townships in Ohio